Arenoso is a town in the Duarte province of the Dominican Republic.

References

Sources 
World Gazeteer: Dominican Republic – World-Gazetteer.com

Populated places in Duarte Province
Municipalities of the Dominican Republic